Acalyptris unicornis is a moth of the family Nepticulidae. It is found on the Yucatán Peninsula.

The larvae feed on Schinus species. They mine the leaves of their host plant.

References

Nepticulidae
Moths described in 2013
Moths of Central America